"No me enseñaste" is one of the most successful singles of Thalía to date, taken off her self-titled studio album Thalía. It was released as the second single in America, meanwhile it was released as the third one in Europe.

In March 2022, Billboard named it as the 87th best song of 2002.

More information 
The song was written by Estéfano and Julio Reyes, and produced by Estéfano. The music video for this single was directed by Antti Jokinen and shot in New York City, on this video, Thalía sings with a band in a garage, and in some scenes she sings under the rain. The video was broadcast for first time in August 2002.

Track listings 
CD single
"No me enseñaste" – 4:25
"No me enseñaste" [Marc Anthony Mix / Salsa Remix] – 4:30
"No me enseñaste" [Estéfano Mix / Dance Remix] – 4:18
"No me enseñaste" [Regional Version] – 3:05

Official Remixes/Versions 
 Album Version
 Marc Anthony Mix / Salsa Remix
 Estéfano Mix / Dance Remix
 Regional Version
 Obaman Club Mix
 Obaman Radio Mix

Chart performance
On the Billboard Hot Latin Tracks chart in United States the single debuted at number 49 in the week of August 24, 2002, and climb to number-one nine weeks later, becoming Thalía's third chart topper there (and second consecutive). No Me Enseñaste spent two weeks at pole position, twelve non-consecutive weeks in the Top Ten and 28 weeks in the chart.

Charts

Weekly charts

Year-end charts

References

External links 
"No Me Enseñaste" music video

2002 singles
Number-one singles in Spain
Spanish-language songs
Thalía songs
Pop ballads
Songs written by Estéfano
EMI Latin singles
2002 songs
Songs written by Julio Reyes Copello
Song recordings produced by Estéfano